Graduation Year (French: L'année du bac) is a 1964 French drama film directed by Maurice Delbez and José-André Lacour and starring Jean Desailly, Simone Valère and Paul Amiot.

Cast
 Jean Desailly as M. Terrenoire
 Simone Valère as Mme Terrenoire
 Paul Amiot as Le général
 Jacques Rispal as Le prof Cachou
 Yvette Etiévant as Mme Cathou
 Bernard Murat as Mic
 Jean-Claude Mathieu as Jacques
 Francis Nani as Petit Cachou
 Michel Tureau as Giacomo
 Catherine Lafond as Nicky
 Elisabeth Wiener as Evelyne
 Joëlle Bernard as La fille du "Rendez-vous des chasseurs"
 Robert Vidalin as Maclou

References

Bibliography 
 Martin, Yves. Le cinéma français, 1946-1966: un jeune homme au fil des vagues. Editions Méréal, 1998.

External links 
 

1964 films
1964 drama films
French drama films
1960s French-language films
Films directed by Maurice Delbez
1960s French films